An election to the United States House of Representatives was held in Florida for the 39th Congress on November 29, 1865, shortly after the end of the Civil War.

Background
On January 21, 1861, Florida's Senate and House seats had become vacant when the State seceded from the Union, subsequently joining the Confederate States of America.  Florida had been represented in the Confederate Congress by two Senators and two Representatives.  The Civil War had ended in April 1865, and Florida held its first post-War election on November 29

Election results
The party affiliations of these candidates are unknown.

Post-election
Along with the other former Confederate States, Florida was not permitted to be represented in Congress until after Reconstruction.  Florida was readmitted in 1868, and held its first post-Reconstruction election on May 5, 1868, representation resuming on July 1, 1868, after nearly 7 and a half years' absence from Congress.

See also
United States House of Representatives elections, 1864
1865 Florida gubernatorial election
American Civil War
Reconstruction Era

References

1865
Florida
United States House of Representatives